Maiden Tower may refer to:

 Maiden Tower (Baku), Azerbaijan
 Maiden Tower (Gadabay), Azerbaijan
 Maiden Tower (Jabrayil), Azerbaijan
 Maiden Tower (ballet)
 Maiden's Tower, Istanbul, Turkey